Petr Holík (born March 3, 1992) is a Czech professional ice hockey player who currently plays for HC Kometa Brno in the Czech Extraliga (ELH). He formerly played in his native Czech Republic with PSG Zlín and BK Mladá Boleslav.

After spending his first seven seasons of his career with Zlín, Holík accepted a new challenge in agreeing to a two-year contract with Russian club, Severstal Cherepovets of the Kontinental Hockey League (KHL) on April 27, 2017.

He was invited to the Czech Republic National Junior Team camp, for the IIHF World Junior Championship in 2011.

References

External links

1992 births
Living people
BK Mladá Boleslav players
Czech ice hockey centres
HC Kometa Brno players
Severstal Cherepovets players
PSG Berani Zlín players
Sportspeople from Zlín
Czech expatriate ice hockey players in Russia